Balapur Assembly constituency is one of the 288 constituencies of Maharashtra State Assembly and one of the five which are located in Akola district.

It is a part of the Akola (Lok Sabha constituency) along with five other assembly constituencies, viz Akot, Akola West and Akola East, Murtizapur(SC)  and Risod  from the Washim district.

As per orders of Delimitation of Parliamentary and Assembly constituencies Order, 2008, No. 29 Balapur Assembly constituency is composed of the following: 
1. Balapur Tehsil, 2. Patur Tehsil, 3. Akola Tehsil (Part) Revenue Circle - Ugawa of the Akola district.

Members of Legislative Assembly

General elections, 2019

See also
Balapur taluqa 
Patur taluqa

References

Assembly constituencies of Maharashtra
Akola district